Javoddron Reon Holloway "J. C." Copeland (born July 21, 1991) is an American football defensive end and fullback who is currently a free agent. He played college football at LSU. He was signed as an undrafted free agent by the Dallas Cowboys in 2014.

High school career
A native of Columbus, Georgia, Copeland attended Troup County High School in LaGrange, Georgia, where he was a two-way lineman and teammates with future NFL linebacker Reuben Foster. Regarded as a four-star recruit by Rivals.com, Copeland was listed the No. 17 weakside defensive end prospect in his class.

College career
Originally recruited to LSU as a defensive lineman, Copeland was switched to fullback in his true freshman season. In 2012, he was named All-American by Pro Football Weekly.

Copeland was selected to play in the January 2014 edition of the NFLPA Collegiate Bowl. He played for the winning National team and was named game MVP after rushing for two touchdowns.

Professional career

2014 NFL Combine

Dallas Cowboys
In May 2014, Copeland signed with the Dallas Cowboys as an undrafted free agent. The Cowboys released Copeland on August 25, 2014.

New York Jets
Copeland was signed by the New York Jets on May 11, 2015. He was released on August 1, 2015.

References

External links
LSU Tigers bio

1991 births
Living people
Players of American football from Columbus, Georgia
American football fullbacks
LSU Tigers football players
Dallas Cowboys players
New York Jets players